A referendum on repealing the law that abolished the petroleum monopoly held by ANCAP was held in Uruguay on 7 December 2003. The proposal was approved by 64% of voters.

Background
On 27 December 2001 the General Assembly passed law 17,448, abolishing the monopoly held by state-owned petroleum company ANCAP. The Broad Front collected 685,294 signatures against the law. A quorum of 25% of registered voters (607,301) was required to force a referendum. On 25 July the Electoral Court validated 662,675 of the collected signatures, and on 18 August fixed a date for the referendum.

Results

Unassessed votes were those cast by voters away from their local polling station. These would have been counted after their right to vote had been examined, but as the result was not in doubt, the Electoral Court waived the count.

References

2003 referendums
2003 in Uruguay
Referendums in Uruguay
December 2003 events in South America
Jorge Batlle